is a Japanese petrochemical company. It is Japan's third-biggest refiner by sales after JX Holdings and Idemitsu Kosan.

History
Cosmo traces its corporate roots to Maruzen Petroleum (丸善石油株式会社), a company established in 1931, although the oil business operated by Maruzen was originally established by Zenzo Matsumura in Kobe in 1907.

Cosmo Oil Company was formed on April 1, 1986, through the merger of Maruzen Petroleum and Daikyo Petroleum, a group of oil businesses based in Niigata Prefecture, which merged in 1939.

A major fire occurred at the Cosmo refinery in Ichihara, as a result of the 2011 Tōhoku earthquake. It was extinguished after ten days, injuring six people and destroying storage tanks  The ultimate cause was traced to the collapse of supports for LPG Tank 364, which had been filled with water and undergoing hydrostatic testing at the time the earthquake struck.  The collapse fractured LPG pipes, releasing gas that then ignited, in turn igniting LPG in several adjacent tanks.

In February 2015, the company said it will reorganize itself under a holding company to boost profitability. Also in 2015, in March, Cosmo Oil formed an LPG joint-venture, by merging its LPG business with three other company's LPG units. The new company, named Gyxis Corporation, started effective operations on April 1, 2015. Along Cosmo, the other three shareholding companies are Showa Shell Sekiyu, TonenGeneral Sekiyu, and Sumitomo Corporation, all with 25% of the ownership.

Refineries
Cosmo operates three refineries, all of which are located in Japan:

Ichihara, Chiba (former Maruzen refinery): 
Yokkaichi, Mie (former Daikyo refinery): 
Sakai, Osaka (former Maruzen refinery): 

In August 2012, the company announced that it will close its Sakaide plant in southwest Japan.

Gallery

See also
Cosmo Oil Yokkaichi F.C., former football club, originally owned by the Daikyo refinery.

References

External links

 

Oil companies of Japan
Petrochemical companies
Chemical companies based in Tokyo
Oil companies based in Tokyo
Companies listed on the Tokyo Stock Exchange
Retail companies established in 1986
Energy companies established in 1986
Non-renewable resource companies established in 1986
Japanese companies established in 1986
Automotive fuel retailers
Japanese brands
Midori-kai